Centre High School is a rural public secondary school located 5 miles south of Lost Springs and 2 miles north of Lincolnville along U.S. Highway 77 in Marion County, Kansas.  It is operated by Centre USD 397 school district.  It is the sole public high school for the communities of Lincolnville, Lost Springs, Pilsen, Tampa, Ramona, Antelope, Burdick, and nearby rural areas of Marion / Morris / Dickinson / Chase Counties.

History
Centre High School was established in 1958 as the result of the consolidation of several smaller high schools. High schools from Lincolnville, Lost Springs, Pilsen, Burdick, Tampa and Ramona consolidated into Centre Rural High School.

Campus
The front of the building houses the administration offices. Other notable details include:
 A gymnasium on the southern side of the main building and another gym on the east side.
 A football field is located on the north Side.
 To the west is the Centre Middle School that houses grades 5 and 6.
 A machine shop and wood shop are detached and located on the east side.

Academics
The high school is a member of T.E.E.N., a shared video teaching network, started in 1993, between five area high schools.

Extracurricular activities
The mascot of Centre High is the Cougar.

Sports Offered Include:
 Football
 Volleyball
 Basketball
 Track
 Golf
 Baseball

Organizations Offered Include:
 FFA
 FBLA
 Honors Society
 NHS
 Student Council

See also
 List of high schools in Kansas
 List of unified school districts in Kansas

References

External links
 School District
 USD 397 School District Boundary Map, KDOT

Public high schools in Kansas
Schools in Marion County, Kansas
1958 establishments in Kansas